The Czech Social Democratic Party (ČSSD) leadership election of 1997 was held in March 1997. Miloš Zeman received 72% of votes and was reelected. Zeman was the only candidate but he had to face opposition led by Karel Machovec.

References

Czech Social Democratic Party leadership elections
Single-candidate elections
Social Democratic Party leadership election
Indirect elections
Czech Social Democratic Party leadership election
Czech Social Democratic Party leadership election